Marc Thompson  (born 15 January 1982) is an English footballer, who played in the English Football League for York City between 2000 and 2002.

Career

Thompson graduated through the youth side at York City and made his first-team debut in 2000. He was given a three-year pro-contract in May 2000, having shown promise through his first few games. He was awarded the Gerry Davitt Memorial Trophy for the 1999–2000 season. Boston United offered Thompson a trial in December 2001. Harrogate Town expressed an interest in signing Thompson in May 2002, and signed at the start of the 2002–03 season. He then signed for Farnborough Town in August 2003, but was released in February 2004.

Harrogate expressed an interest in re-signing Thompson in February 2004. Thompson was signed by Wakefield-Emley in October 2004.

Thompson was signed by Selby Town in July 2007.
Thompson now plays for Haxby United in the York Leeper Hare Premier League along with former York City players Andy McMillan and Neale Holmes.

Notes

External links

1982 births
Living people
Footballers from York
English footballers
Association football midfielders
York City F.C. players
Harrogate Town A.F.C. players
Farnborough F.C. players
Wakefield F.C. players
Selby Town F.C. players
Haxby United F.C. players
English Football League players